Justin Marks (born March 25, 1981) is an American racing driver, entrepreneur, and current owner of Trackhouse Racing Team in the NASCAR Cup Series. He last competed in the WeatherTech SportsCar Championship, driving the No. 93 for Meyer Shank Racing with Curb-Agajanian in the GT Daytona class.

Marks has competed in sports car and stock car racing, competing in the ARCA Racing Series and NASCAR Camping World Truck Series. He also served as a road course ringer in the NASCAR Xfinity Series and Cup Series.

Early years
Marks was born in St. Louis, Missouri. During his youth, he went with his grandfather (who lived in Iowa), to see local Midwest racers such as Dick Trickle, Ken Schrader, and the Wallace brothers battle on dirt tracks. His family moved to Menlo Park, California when Marks was eight. Marks attended race school while in high school and in 1998 competed in his first race, in the street stock division at Altamont Raceway Park in Tracy, California. At the same time as his racing career was beginning, he was attending California State University with the intention of obtaining a degree in sports marketing. Marks withdrew from college 14 credits shy of completing his degree to focus on racing.

Racing career

Sports car racing
At 18, Marks entered the SCCA Regional Racing Series, and later the Speed World Challenge Series. With success in the SCCA, Marks moved to the Rolex Sports Car Series GT Class in 2004 where he met good friend Joey Hand. Switching between the GT class and the World Challenge, Marks raced up four wins, eight podiums, and thirteen top tens between the two series.  In 2005 Marks again raced in the Rolex Sports Car Series where he won 3 races with teammate Joey Hand.  At the same time, Marks teamed with Bill Auberlen in the Continental Tire Sports Car Challenge for Turner Motorsport, finishing 3rd in points with 5 poles and 5 wins in 9 starts.

NASCAR

In 2006, Marks left road racing to pursue a career in NASCAR. In 2006, Marks raced for RAB Racing in the ARCA RE/MAX Series, driving their No. 65. Although he did not pick up any wins in his two years there, Marks turned many heads with his driving ability. In 2007 he was picked up by Germain Racing of the Craftsman Truck Series to drive their No. 03 truck. Marks again impressed many with an eighth-place finish at Homestead-Miami Speedway. This cemented his future as the driver of the No. 9 Crocs/Construct Corps Toyota for 2008, running for Rookie of the Year.

In 2008, Marks raced in the Truck Series, the Nationwide Series, and the ARCA RE/MAX Series for a number of teams. He won the pole position for the NASCAR Craftsman Truck Series race at Texas Motor Speedway as well as the ARCA RE/MAX Series season opener at Daytona International Speedway. Marks returned to the Camping World Truck Series for 2011, driving for Turn One Racing in the No. 66 Chevrolet.

In 2013, Marks made his Sprint Cup Series debut at Sonoma Raceway in the 2013 Toyota/Save Mart 350, driving the No. 7 of Tommy Baldwin Racing, substituting for Dave Blaney. Marks had little experience in the Generation 6 cars, having run the cars only once in a road course test at Virginia International Raceway.

The following year, Marks was signed by Turner Scott Motorsports to run the No. 31 in the Nationwide Series at Road America and Mid-Ohio Sports Car Course.

On February 10, Marks announced he would return to the Cup Series in 2015, driving the No. 29 for RAB Racing in the Daytona 500, while also running the No. 29 in the Xfinity Series and the No. 35 with Win-Tron Racing in the other Daytona races.  However, Marks failed to qualify for the 500, and crashed out of both the Xfinity and Truck races, finishing last in the latter.  In June, he joined Front Row Motorsports for the Toyota/Save Mart 350.

In the summer of 2015, Marks ran the road course races at Road America and Mid-Ohio in the Xfinity Series, driving the No. 42 Chevrolet for Chip Ganassi Racing, owned by Harry Scott, Jr.

In 2016, Marks expanded his Chip Ganassi Racing schedule in the Xfinity Series, driving the No. 42 in several races starting at Las Vegas Motor Speedway. At the Mid-Ohio Sports Car Course, Marks led a race-high 43 laps in a race plagued by rain to claim his first NASCAR victory; he dedicated the win to former Ganassi driver Bryan Clauson, who had died earlier in the week in an accident.

In 2017, Marks returned to the Xfinity Series driving the No. 42 for Chip Ganassi Racing at the Mid-Ohio Sports Car Course finishing 9th and at Road America finishing 4th. On October 15, Marks joined Tommy Baldwin Racing's No. 7 for his return to the Cup Series at Talladega Superspeedway. It was his first non road course start in the Monster Energy series. However he finished last after getting into an incident.

In 2018, Marks ran the season opening Daytona 500 in the No. 51 for Rick Ware Racing with support from Premium Motorsports. He brought the car home 12th, which was by far his best oval track finish in the Cup series. He later partnered with Premium Motorsports to drive the No. 15 at Sonoma and the Charlotte Roval.

In 2022, he returned to NASCAR, competing in the #41 Chevrolet for Niece Motorsports at Mid Ohio.

Grand Am Rolex Sports Car Series return
Marks returned to the Grand Am Rolex Sports Car Series for the 2009 season driving the TRG No. 67 No Fear/Construct Corps Porsche with teammate Andy Lally.  The team began the season with an impressive victory in the GT class at the Rolex 24 Hours of Daytona.

ARCA Racing Series
On December 17, 2009, Lakeville, Minnesota's Win-Tron Racing announced that Marks would drive their No. 32 Toyota in the 2010 ARCA Racing Series season.

Entrepreneurial career
Marks' father, Michael, is a partner in the private equity firm Riverwood Capital, board member of GoPro and a minority owner in the Golden State Warriors. He also served as an executive at Crocs and the interim CEO of Tesla Motors.

Marks and Michael McDowell operate a karting facility called the GoPro Motorplex, located 30 miles north of Charlotte, North Carolina. The facility opened in October 2012, and was inspired by another karting track located in Parma, Italy.

In 2015, HScott Motorsports owner Harry Scott Jr. took control of TSM's K&N Pro Series East team, and partnered with Marks to field four cars under the banner HScott Motorsports with Justin Marks for Scott Heckert, William Byron, J. J. Haley, Dalton Sargeant, and Rico Abreu. Marks also owned a World of Outlaws team, Larson Marks Racing, with Kyle Larson before relinquishing his stake to Larson in 2018 to focus on sports car racing.

In August 2020, Marks partnered with former NASCAR executive Ty Norris to create Trackhouse Racing Team, a Cup Series team that debuted in 2021. The team operates on a cause marketing strategy that includes a STEM education program for minority populations in the United States.

On June 30, 2021, Trackhouse announced their purchase of the NASCAR operations of Chip Ganassi Racing, with its two charters for the No. 1 and the No. 42 teams, therefore announcing the team will be two cars in 2022. A driver, sponsors, and number will be announced later. It was later announced that the 1 car would turn to Trackhouse with Ross Chastain driving it. Marks got his first win as a car owner on March 27th, 2022 with Chastain, winning at the Circuit of the Americas in Austin, Texas.

On January 9, 2023, a consortium consisting of Trackhouse, DEJ Management, Jeff Burton Autosports, Inc., and Kevin Harvick Incorporated purchased the CARS Tour.

Motorsports career results

NASCAR
(key) (Bold – Pole position awarded by qualifying time. Italics – Pole position earned by points standings or practice time. * – Most laps led.)

Monster Energy Cup Series

Daytona 500

Xfinity Series

Camping World Truck Series

ARCA Racing Series
(key) (Bold – Pole position awarded by qualifying time. Italics – Pole position earned by points standings or practice time. * – Most laps led.)

Complete WeatherTech SportsCar Championship results
(key) (Races in bold indicate pole position) (Races in italics indicate fastest lap)

Superstar Racing Experience
(key) * – Most laps led. 1 – Heat 1 winner. 2 – Heat 2 winner.

References

External links

Living people
1981 births
People from Placer County, California
Racing drivers from California
24 Hours of Daytona drivers
NASCAR drivers
ARCA Menards Series drivers
Rolex Sports Car Series drivers
Sportspeople from Greater Sacramento
Meyer Shank Racing drivers
WeatherTech SportsCar Championship drivers
Chip Ganassi Racing drivers